Megan Lee (born September 18, 1995) is a Korean-American actress, director and former singer-songwriter best known for her role as "Sun Hi Song" on Make It Pop and her singing talents on YouTube.

Early life and education
Lee was born in Los Angeles, California and raised in Northridge, California. She officially began her professional career in acting and singing at the age of 10. In 2013, she eventually moved to Seoul, South Korea and was home-schooled through high school after having been signed to South Korean Kim Tae-woo's (lead singer of g.o.d) label, Soul Shop Entertainment.

Career

2007–2010: Early acting roles and Nickelodeon 
Since the age of 10, Lee first appeared in numerous national commercials including spots for McDonald's, Verizon Wireless, Nintendo (the Nintendo DS), Bratz, Kidz Bop, Wal-Mart, Big Lots, and Trix as well as TV programs such as the Crash TV series, iCarly, Nickelodeon's Kids' Choice Awards, Disney's Get Connected, 3 Minute Game Show & various independent film projects. 

In 2008, Lee had won the Nickelodeon Kids' Choice Awards Best Speech Contest at the 2008 Kids' Choice Awards. She also played Hyori in the Short Film/Music Video, My First Crush, directed by Rocky Jo, with Arden Cho starring as the older Hyori. Also in 2008, Lee starred as "Julie" in several episodes of Disney's TV Series, "Disney Get Connected." She also played "Ji Sun" in an episode of Crash alongside Dennis Hopper, Tom Sizemore, Brian Tee and Kelvin Han Yee.

2014–2022: Transition to mainstream roles 
In 2014, Lee was officially cast and starred as a lead member of XO-IQ, featured in the hit Nickelodeon series Make It Pop. She was one of the show's three main stars and plays a character named "Sun Hi Song", alongside Filipino-Canadian Louriza Tronco and Singaporean-Canadian Erika Tham. The series was co-produced by Nick Cannon.

After Make It Pop finished airing for 2 seasons on Nickelodeon, Lee would go on to appear in several other television shows and feature films, such as The Other Kingdom, Modern Family, and S.W.A.T.

Lee will next appear on Murmur after having won several film festival awards, including Best Ensemble, alongside fellow co-stars Logan Polish, Colin Ford, Johnny Jay Lee, Cyrus Arnold, and Brandon Wilson, and directed by Mark Polish.

2022–Present: Film Directing 
In 2022, Lee began taking film directing courses at UCLA, studying under TV director Peter Lauer. She makes her official directorial debut in 2023 with her short film titled En Pointe.

Music
Lee writes her own original songs and released three singles as an independent artist, "In The Future", "Love, Laugh & Live" and "Destiny." "Love, Laugh & Live" was Megan's first official music video and was shot and directed by Steve Nguyen. "Destiny" was also made into a music video, and was directed by Timothy Tau.In May 2019, she released her debut extended play, I Am. and released a new single, "Me, Myself and I", with its lyric video released simultaneously; the song served as the lead single of her debut extended play, I Am, which was released on May 24.

K-Pop 
Lee also contested in South Korea's popular show, MBC Star Audition - The Great Birth (위대한 탄생) Season 1 (and Season 2) on one of South Korea's main broadcast networks (MBC). On Season 2 of MBC's Star Audition, Lena Park personally selected Megan over a number of other competitors to be Megan's mentor. She also finished in the Top 13 of contestants at the end of Season 2. 
Lee has also written music for various K-Pop artists such as Exo's Baekhyun and Girls' Generation's Taeyeon.

Lee's official debut track during her time on Soul Shop Entertainment was entitled "8dayz" (read as 8 Days), which was released on May 15, 2014. The track features B2ST's Yong Jun-hyung, and is also composed by German composers Andreas Bärtels and Rüdiger Schramm, who also composed a track for veteran K-pop singer Nami.

Lee and her vocals are also featured in the g.o.d reunion track, "The Story of Our Lives." The music video for the song was released on July 11, 2014, and marked the first time the band g.o.d has sung together in over 10 years.

Lee has also released a music video and track with Kim Tae-woo entitled "Oppa".

On November 10, 2014, Megan Lee filed a civil lawsuit with the Seoul District Court against Soul Shop Entertainment requesting nullification of her 5-year contract. Megan, along with her representation, claimed that she was severely verbally abused by some of the members of management, and that intimidation tactics were used to impose their will on her career. She also claimed that a contract was signed on her behalf without her consent, a fraudulent bank account in her name was made without her consent, and that the financial activity regarding her career with Soul Shop was not made transparent as it was promised to her in their initial agreement with the label.

During the second half of 2018, a song written by Lee titled 'Psycho', which was sung by EXO's Baekhyun, was performed exclusively during EXO's recent Elyxion concert. The original piece was solely written by Lee, and produced by Zayson, and soon went viral.

Lee also co-wrote "Horizon" for Taeyeon's Japanese extended play, Voice.

The Voice
In 2018, Lee was a contestant in season 14 of the American music talent show The Voice, where she was eliminated in the Battle round. In an episode broadcast on March 6, 2018, she performed "Killing Me Softly with His Song", with Alicia Keys turning her chair. In the Battles Round broadcast on March 19, 2018, she was confronted with Team Alicia teammate Johnny Bliss both singing "Versace on the Floor" from Bruno Mars.

YouTube 
Lee is most likely known for her viral covers of pop songs, many of which have received significant view counts including covers of Christina Aguilera's "I Will Be", Bruno Mars' "Lazy Song", Lil Wayne's "How to Love", Kelly Clarkson's "Stronger (What Doesn't Kill you)" and others. She has also collaborated with other YouTube artists, for example, when she covered "Forget You" by Cee Lo Green with Arden Cho in 2011. In 2011, Lee also won 2NE1's "Lonely" Cover Contest with her cover of 2NE1's single "Lonely", and was flown to Korea to meet with the group. She also made a cover of Adele's "Someone Like You" on YouTube with Sungha Jung. 

In 2012 she won a Cover Contest sponsored by Jason Mraz and Warner Music Korea, and collaborated with Mraz in a duet for his track, "Lucky" which is viewable on YouTube.
She has also performed and recorded a number of duets with acoustic guitarist Sungha Jung, covering famous K-pop songs such as "Monster" by BIGBANG.

Filmography

Film

Television

Discography

Original singles

Extended plays

Collaboration singles

Cover singles

References

External links 
 
 Official Facebook

1995 births
Living people
American expatriates in South Korea
American women pop singers
American women singer-songwriters
American film actresses
American folk singers
American actresses of Korean descent
American musicians of Korean descent
Korean-language singers of the United States
American folk-pop singers
American K-pop singers
American YouTubers
21st-century American women singers
The Voice (franchise) contestants
Twitch (service) streamers
21st-century American singers